Min jul may refer to:

Min jul (Jan Johansen album), Swedish album 2013
Min jul (Sanna Nielsen album), Swedish album 2013
Min Jul (Maria Arredondo album), Norwegian album

See also
Välkommen till min jul, a 2001 album by Jan Malmsjö